Megan Lynne Talde Young (born February 27, 1990) is a Filipino-American actress, model, television presenter and beauty queen who won the Miss World Philippines 2013 title and was later crowned as Miss World 2013. She is the first Filipina to win the title of Miss World.

Young started as a contestant on the reality television show StarStruck .

Early life and education
Young was born on February 27, 1990, in Alexandria, Virginia to Victoria Talde, from Pandan, Antique, and American Calvin Cole Young III.

Young's family moved to Castillejos, Zambales when she was ten. She received secondary education at the Regional Science High School III within the Subic Bay Freeport Zone from 2002 to 2005 before moving to Metro Manila to pursue her acting career. In 2011, she began studying filmmaking at De La Salle-College of Saint Benilde.

Career

2004–07: Early acting career in GMA
Young's first showbiz break was through the second season of the talent reality search StarStruck, where she placed in the top six. Her first acting job in GMA was in Love to Love Presents: Love Ko Urok, where she played the role of Meg. She then played the role of Anna in Asian Treasures and the role of a fairy in Mga Kuwento ni Lola Basyang.

2007–14: Transfer to ABS-CBN and TV5
After more than two years with GMA Artist Center, she moved to ABS-CBN following her sister, Lauren Young. She is the first StarStruck alumna to transfer to GMA's rival station, ABS-CBN.

Young first appeared in ABS-CBN in the youth oriented show "Star Magic Presents" Astigs and Abt Ur Luv. She also played the role of Shane in Kokey, opposite Zanjoe Marudo. She became well known when she appeared as one of the celebrity housemates in Pinoy Big Brother: Celebrity Edition 2, dubbed as "The Princess of Charm". 
After PBB, she portrayed the villain Marcela in ABS-CBN's remake of I Love Betty La Fea opposite John Lloyd Cruz. In 2009, she was one of four personalities introduced as video jockeys for the relaunching of Channel [V] Philippines. Young also became an occasional host in several shows in Studio 23. In 2012, Young had her big break as a lead actress in Hiyas, reuniting with Zanjoe Marudo as her love interest. In 2013, she switched to TV5 but still made appearances in the Kapamilya network.

Aside from television, Young has also starred in a few films, one of which was The Reunion, where she played Toyang, opposite Xian Lim. Young was nominated as Outstanding Guest Star on Dahsyatnya Awards 2014.

2015–present: Return to GMA Network
In March 2015, Megan Young returned to GMA Network after four years of exclusive contract with ABS-CBN. Her comeback project in the Kapuso Network is the most anticipated second adaptation of the hit Mexicanovela MariMar where she plays the title role. She is paired with Tom Rodriguez who plays the role of her love interest Sergio. Her sister Lauren Young is also part of the show and plays the role of MariMar's main antagonist Antonia. This marks their second project together after Star Magic Presents: Abt Ur Luv Ur Lyf 2.

Megan is also one of the hosts in the sixth edition of the reality talent search Starstruck which launched her career as an artist. She's working alongside Dingdong Dantes as main host, and her co-Starstruck alumni Mark Herras, Rocco Nacino, Miguel Tanfelix, and Kris Bernal, who serve as journey hosts. The show premiered on September 7, 2015.

Pageantry

Miss World Philippines 2013
She was crowned Miss World Philippines 2013 during the pageant coronation night on August 18, 2013. She also bagged the Best in Fashion Runway, Miss Sports by Fila, Miss Reducin, Miss Olay, Miss Laguna, Miss Figlia and Miss Bench Body awards.

On October 12, 2014, Young crowned Valerie Weigmann as her successor at the Miss World Philippines 2014 pageant held at the Mall of Asia Arena in Pasay, Philippines.

Miss World 2013
Young was crowned as Miss World 2013 in Bali, Indonesia, making her the first Filipina to win the title of Miss World since its creation in 1951. 
During the preliminaries, she also won the "Top Model" competition, placed second in the "People's Champion," placed fourth in the "Multimedia Challenge" and fifth in the "Beach Beauty" contest.

In the final question and answer portion, the contestants in the Top 6 were asked the same question: "Why should you be the next Miss World?" and Young replied:

Young also received the Continental Queen of Beauty title as Miss World Asia 2013, the highest ranked contestant in the Asian region and was featured in the Dances of the World segment of the final show.

On December 14, 2014, Young crowned Rolene Strauss as her successor at the Miss World 2014 pageant held at the ExCeL London in London, United Kingdom.

Personal life

Young is the elder sister of actress Lauren Young.

In February 2017, Mikael Daez confirmed that he had been dating Young for six years, and the revelation was made after so long due to work commitments. On January 25, 2020, they announced their marriage.

Filmography

Television

Film

Music videos

Notes

References

External links

 Website

1990 births
Living people
De La Salle–College of Saint Benilde alumni
Filipino film actresses
Filipino female models
Female models from Virginia
Filipino television actresses
Actresses from Alexandria, Virginia
Actresses from Zambales
Miss World 2013 delegates
Miss World Philippines winners
Miss World winners
Pinoy Big Brother contestants
StarStruck (Philippine TV series) participants
StarStruck (Philippine TV series)
VJs (media personalities)
GMA Network personalities